Klitsov, female form Klitsova, is a Russian surname.

Notable people with this surname include:

Igor Klitsov (born 1986), Russian football player
Dmitry Klitsov (born 1988), Russian football player

Russian-language surnames